The Ministry of Finance is a government ministry of Belize responsible for public finances. Traditionally, Prime Minister of Belize has also held the portfolio of Minister of Finance.

Ministers of Finance
George Cadle Price, 1961-1984
Manuel Esquivel, 1984-1989
George Cadle Price, 1989-1993
Manuel Esquivel, 1993-1998
Said Musa, 1998-2003
Ralph Fonseca, 2003-2004, first non-PM Minister of Finance
Said Musa, 2004-2008
Dean Barrow, 2008-2020
John Briceño, 2020-

See also
Government of Belize
Central Bank of Belize
Economy of Belize

References

Government of Belize
Government ministries of Belize
Economy of Belize
Belize
1961 establishments in British Honduras